In the late 4th century BC, the Yan feudal state invaded the Gojoseon kingdom. The military campaign was led by General Qin Kai. The invasion resulted in Yan's conquest of the Liaodong Peninsula from Gojoseon.

See also
 Gojoseon–Han War

References

Gojoseon
4th-century BC conflicts
Wars involving Imperial China
Wars involving Korea
Military campaigns involving China